2010 Chebyshev, provisional designation , is a rare-type carbonaceous asteroid from the outer regions of the asteroid belt, approximately 25 kilometers in diameter. The asteroid was discovered on 13 October 1969, by Soviet astronomer Bella Burnasheva at the Crimean Astrophysical Observatory in Nauchnyj, on the Crimean peninsula. It was named for mathematician Pafnuty Chebyshev.

Classification and orbit 

Chebyshev orbits the Sun in the outer main-belt at a distance of 2.5–3.7 AU once every 5 years and 5 months (1,983 days). Its orbit has an eccentricity of 0.19 and an inclination of 2° with respect to the ecliptic.

Physical characteristics

Spectral type 

In the Tholen classification, Chebyshev is a rare BU: type, a variation of the carbonaceous B-type asteroids.

Diameter and albedo 

According to the survey carried out by the NEOWISE mission of NASA's space-based Wide-field Infrared Survey Explorer, Chebyshev measures 24.649 kilometers in diameter and its surface has an albedo of 0.065. Chebyshev has an absolute magnitude of 11.62.

Lightcurve 

As of 2017, Chebyshev rotation period and shape remain unknown.

Naming 

This minor planet was named after Russian mathematician and mechanician Pafnuty Chebyshev (1821–1894). The official  was published by the Minor Planet Center on 1 September 1978. The lunar crater Chebyshev was also named in his honor.

References

External links 
 Asteroid Lightcurve Database (LCDB), query form (info )
 Dictionary of Minor Planet Names, Google books
 Asteroids and comets rotation curves, CdR – Observatoire de Genève, Raoul Behrend
 Discovery Circumstances: Numbered Minor Planets (1)-(5000) – Minor Planet Center
 
 

002010
Discoveries by Bella A. Burnasheva
Named minor planets
002010
19691013